Xylophanes porcus, the porcus sphinx, is a moth of the family Sphingidae. The family was first described by Jacob Hübner in 1823.

Distribution 
It is found from Florida south to Bolivia.

Description 
The wingspan is 70–79 mm. The forewing upperside has a distinct discal spot. The antemedian and postmedian bands are represented by diffuse olive-green clouds and the submarginal band is reduced to a single row of small dots.

Biology 
Adults are probably on wing year round in the tropics. They probably feed on flower nectar.

The larvae of the nominate subspecies feed on Hamelia patens, Psychotria horizontalis, Psychotria pubescens, Psychotria microdon and Palicourea grandifolia. The larvae of subspecies continentalis probably feed on Rubiaceae and Malvaceae species.

Subspecie s
Xylophanes porcus porcus (Florida south to French Guiana and Venezuela)
Xylophanes porcus continentalis Rothschild & Jordan, 1903 (Mexico and Belize south across northern South America (including Colombia) to French Guiana. Also recorded from Bolivia)

References

porcus
Moths described in 1823
Moths of South America